The former McGehee Post Office building is a historic post office facility at 201 North Second Street in McGehee, Arkansas.  The single story masonry building was designed by the Office of the Supervising Architect under Louis A. Simon, and built in 1937.  A Colonial Revival building, it features a cupola with round-arch louvered vents, and a front entry that is flanked by Doric columns supporting a cornice with a golden eagle.  The building served as a post office until 1999, after which it was purchased by the McGehee Industrial Foundation.

The building was listed on the National Register of Historic Places in 2010.

See also
National Register of Historic Places listings in Desha County, Arkansas

References

Post office buildings on the National Register of Historic Places in Arkansas
Colonial Revival architecture in Arkansas
Government buildings completed in 1937
National Register of Historic Places in Desha County, Arkansas
1937 establishments in Arkansas